Herova? Zerova? is a 2008 Indian Tamil-language short docudrama produced by Suriya. Sponsored by the Ministry of Education of Tamil Nadu, the 5-minute film was directed by V. Priya with cinematography by K. V. Anand and music by Harris Jayaraj. It was featured on Kalaignar TV and officially uploaded to YouTube, but was later removed.

The film highlighted the importance of childhood education and sought to create awareness of early dropouts and child labour in Tamil Nadu. In the intro of the film, then-chief minister M. Karunanidhi recites his own poem on education. Along with Suriya, actors R. Madhavan, Jyothika and Vijay (in order of appearance) feature as themselves.

Cast 
Vijay as himself
R. Madhavan as himself
Jyothika as herself
Suriya as himself

References

Indian short films
2008 films
2000s Tamil-language films